The  was a cabinet-level ministry in the Empire of Japan charged with the administrative affairs of the Imperial Japanese Navy (IJN). It existed from 1872 to 1945.

History

Initially, the Navy Ministry was in charge of both administration and operational command of the Imperial Japanese Navy. However, with the creation of the Imperial Japanese Navy General Staff in May 1893, it was left with only administrative functions.

"The ministry was responsible for the naval budget, ship construction, weapons procurement, personnel, relations with the Diet and the cabinet and broad matters of naval policy. The General Staff directed the operations of the fleet and the preparation of war plans".
The post of Navy Minister was politically powerful. Although a member of the Cabinet after the establishment of the cabinet system of government in 1885, the Navy Minister was answerable directly to the Emperor (the commander-in-chief of all Japanese armed forces under the Meiji Constitution) and not the Prime Minister.

Up until the 1920s, the Navy Ministry held the upper hand over the Navy General Staff in terms of political influence. However, the officers of the Navy General Staff found an opportunity at the Washington Naval Conference in 1921–22 to improve their situation. At this meeting, the United States and Britain wanted to establish a worldwide naval ratio, asking the Japanese to limit themselves to a smaller navy than the Western powers. The Naval Ministry was willing to agree to this, seeking to maintain the Anglo-Japanese Alliance, but the Navy General Staff refused. The Imperial Japanese Navy became divided into mutually hostile Fleet Faction and Treaty Faction political cliques. Ultimately, the treaty was signed by Japan, but terminated in 1934. Through the 1930s, with increasing Japanese militarism, the Fleet Faction gradually gained ascendancy over the Treaty Faction and came to dominate the Navy General Staff, which pushed through the attack on Pearl Harbor against the resistance of the Navy Ministry.

After 1937, both the Navy Minister and the Chief of the Navy General Staff were members of the Imperial General Headquarters.

With the defeat of the Empire of Japan in World War II, the Navy Ministry was abolished together with the Imperial Japanese Navy by the American occupation authorities in November 1945 and was not revived in the post-war Constitution of Japan.

Organization

Internally operating divisions
Military Affairs Bureau
Mobilization Bureau
Technical Bureau
Personnel Bureau
Training Bureau
Medical Bureau
Shipyard Bureau
Naval Construction Bureau
Legal Bureau
Administrative/Accounting Bureau

Externally operating divisions
Navy Aviation Bureau
Navy Academy
Naval War College
Naval Accounting School
Navy Medical School
Naval Engineering School
Submarine Division
Canals and Waterways Division
Naval Technical Department
Naval Tribunal
Tokyo Naval Tribunal
Chemical Warfare Division
Radio and Radar Division
Supply and Transport Bureau
Naval Construction Division
Naval Maintenance & Repair Division
Special Attack Weapons Division
Emergency Reaction Division
Naval Aviation Training Division
Naval Intelligence Division

Ministers of the Navy of Japan

By law, Navy Ministers had to be appointed from active duty admirals or vice-admirals.

Naval Lords under the Ministry of War
Katsu Kaishū
Kawamura Sumiyoshi
Enomoto Takeaki (28 February 1880 – 7 April 1881)
Nakamuta Kuranosuke
Kabayama Sukenori

Naval Ministers under the Meiji Constitution

See also
 Imperial Japanese Navy General Staff

References

Notes

Books

External links
"Foreign Office Files for Japan and the Far East". Adam Matthew Publications.

Imperial Japanese Navy
Navy
Politics of the Empire of Japan
1872 establishments in Japan
1945 disestablishments in Japan